Muhammed Sanneh (born 19 February 2000) is a Gambian professional footballer who plays as a right-back for Baník Ostrava.

Career
On 2 February 2019, Sanneh left his native Gambia and signed a professional contract with Paide. In December 2020, he was named into the Meistriliiga team of the season for his performance in the 2020 season. He joined the Czech team Baník Ostrava in January 2021. He made his professional debut with Baník Ostrava in a 1–1 Czech First League tie with Bohemians 1905 on 16 April 2021. Baník Ostrava activated his buyout clause on his loan, to keep with the club beyond the 2020–2021 season on 17 April 2021.

Loan at Pohronie
In January 2021, Sanneh signed a half-season loan with Pohronie.

International career
In June 2020, Sanneh received his first call-up to the senior Gambia national team. He debuted for the Gambia in a 1–0 friendly win over Togo on 8 June 2021.

Personal life
Sanneh's older brother Bubacarr is also a professional footballer.

References

External links
 
 

2000 births
Living people
People from Serekunda
Gambian footballers
Gambian expatriate footballers
The Gambia international footballers
Association football fullbacks
Paide Linnameeskond players
FC Baník Ostrava players
FK Pohronie players
Meistriliiga players
Czech First League players
Moravian-Silesian Football League players
Slovak Super Liga players
Expatriate footballers in Estonia
Gambian expatriate sportspeople in Estonia
Expatriate footballers in the Czech Republic
Gambian expatriate sportspeople in the Czech Republic
Expatriate footballers in Slovakia
Gambian expatriate sportspeople in Slovakia